The women's points race at the 2019 European Games was held at the Minsk Velodrome on 27 June 2019.

Results
100 laps (25 km) were raced with 10 sprints.

References

Women's points race